Hale is a village in Surrey, England or part of Farnham, towards Aldershot excluding the area between the two to the east which is Badshot Lea, and without formal definition in part overlaps Weybourne and Heath End, Surrey. The history of Farnham being a vast town parish (over many square miles) in the late medieval age means all three small places overlapping, which are difficult to class as villages, for example Farnham Youth football club is in two possible alternates, or within greater Farnham as its name suggests, and some maps give Lower Hale and Upper Hale but the area between is indistinct and all of the village is quite elevated so this extremely fine distinction unless referring to an extreme end is deprecated. On the side of the Farnham clay and sandstone range. Some housing and roads have views southward towards the Greensand Ridge from Hindhead to Ewhurst. The electoral ward Farnham Upper Hale has a population of 4,241.  Often the eastern built-up (low-rise) area, Weybourne is considered separately but both localities share all amenities and form a neatly buffered settlement.

History
There is evidence that the area has been occupied since the Mesolithic period. Some of the oldest surviving buildings in Hale date from the late 17th century, in the area once known as Hungry Hill.

The oldest place of worship in the village is a chapel built in 1834. St John's Church was founded in 1844. It was paid for by Bishop Sumner and designed by the architect Benjamin Ferrey. Sumner is buried in the churchyard with his wife.

Hale grew rapidly after 1854 when the British Army became established in Aldershot. Many people came to the area seeking employment in building the nearby town and barracks. As the cottages spread, those nearer to Aldershot formed a separate village, which became known as Heath End. In recognition of the services they had rendered, the army gave the villagers of Hale  of land for a new cemetery, Upper Hale Cemetery. The church of St Mark the Evangelist was built opposite the cemetery in 1883.

Buildings and structures
At Upper Hale, there is at 51°14'5"N 0°48'54"W a 27.43 metres (90 ft) tall wooden radio tower. It is one of the few wooden radio towers in the world and today used by radio amateurs as ATV relay station .

Schools

Primary schools 
There are two primary schools in Upper Hale, which are:
 Hale School
 Folly Hill Infant School
As well as these, William Cobbett Primary School is also on the outskirts of nearby Weybourne.

Secondary schools 
There are no secondary schools in Hale, but Farnham Heath End School is very close-by, and All Hallows School is in Weybourne, near to William Cobbett Primary School.

Higher education 
All Higher Education options would be provided by nearby Guildford, Farnham and Farnborough.

See also 
Caesar's Camp, Rushmoor and Waverley
List of places of worship in Waverley (borough)

References

External links

 Villages surrounding Farnham

Villages in Surrey
Borough of Waverley